Baldwin is a town in Randolph County, Illinois, United States. The population was 373 at the 2010 census. Baldwin Lake State Fish and Wildlife Area is nearby.

Geography

Demographics

As of the census of 2010, there were 373 people, 146 households, and 101 families residing in the village. The racial makeup of the village was 97.9% White, 0.0% African American, 0.0% Native American, 0.3% Asian, 0.0% Pacific Islander, 0.0% some other race, and 1.9% from two or more races. Hispanic or Latino of any race were 1.3% of the population.

There were 146 households, out of which 28.1% had children under the age of 18 living with them, 47.9% were married couples living together, 13.7% had a female householder with no husband present, and 30.8% were non-families. 27.4% of all households were made up of individuals, and 6.9% had someone living alone who was 65 years of age or older. The average household size was 2.55 and the average family size was 3.06.

In the village, the population was spread out, with 24.7% under the age of 18, 9.7% from 18 to 24, 28.7% from 25 to 44, 26.1% from 45 to 64, and 11.0% who were 65 years of age or older. The median age was 36.5 years. For every 100 females, there were 100.5 males. For every 100 females age 18 and over, there were 99.3 males.

At the 2000 census, the median income for a household in the village was $32,083, and the median income for a family was $31,528. Males had a median income of $22,096 versus $25,147 for females. The per capita income for the village was $13,009. About 8.1% of families and 9.3% of the population were below the poverty line, including 13.2% of those under age 18 and none of those age 65 or over.

References

External links
News from Randolph County
 Randolph County Herald Tribune, local newspaper

Villages in Randolph County, Illinois
Villages in Illinois